Heinz Werner Zimmermann (11 August 1930 – 25 January 2022) was a German composer, focused on contemporary sacred music. He was professor of composition at the Spandauer Kirchenmusikschule and the Frankfurt University of Music and Performing Arts, and held several honorary doctorates from the Wittenberg University in Springfield, Ohio, U.S., and from the University of Leipzig. He is known for church music influenced by jazz, such as motets for choir with plucked bass.

Life 
Zimmermann was born in Freiburg im Breisgau and had his first composition instruction from 1946 to 1948 with Julius Weismann. He studied from 1950 to 1954 at the Kirchenmusikalisches Institut Heidelberg (Institute for Church Music) in Heidelberg, with Wolfgang Fortner. After passing his examinations at the Freiburg Conservatory, supervised by Harald Genzmer, he became Fortner's successor in Heidelberg immediately. Here he maintained close contacts with the musicologist Thrasybulos Georgiades, whose rhythm and language studies influenced him the most, along with his occupation with American spirituals and jazz.

From 1963 to 1976, Zimmermann was director of the Spandauer Kirchenmusikschule (Spandau school of church music) in Spandau, and then from 1975 to 1996 as successor to Kurt Hessenberg as composition teacher at the Frankfurt University of Music and Performing Arts.

Personal life 
Zimmermann was married to the organist Renate Zimmermann. They lived in Oberursel, where he died on 25 January 2022, at the age of 91.

Works 
Zimmermann's best-known works are his sacred motets with plucked double bass, his organ psalms, and his "Prosalieder". One of his chief works is the Missa profana which he created over 15 years, set for a vocal quartet, choir, dixieland jazz band, tape, and large orchestra. Completed in 1980, it was premiered in Minneapolis in 1981. Others are the sacred oratorio The Bible of Spirituals, Te Deum, and Symphonia sacra. His Don-Giovanni-Variationen for orchestra premiered in Frankfurt in 2020.

Awards 
Amongst other honours, Zimmermann was awarded the Music Prizes of Berlin, a Villa Massimo scholarship in 1965/66, and he received the Johann Sebastian Bach Prize of Stuttgart in 1982. The American Wittenberg University in Springfield bestowed upon him an honorary doctorate, followed by three American theses dedicated to his work, including one at the Stanford University in California. In 2009, he received the honorary doctorate from the University of Leipzig. In 2012, he was awarded the Order of Merit of the Federal Republic of Germany.

References

Citations

Cited sources

Further reading 
 Brusniak, Friedhelm. 2005. Heinz Werner Zimmermann. Tutzing: Schneider. 
 Brusniak, Friedhelm, and Heinz Werner Zimmermann. 2000. Komposition und Kontemplation. Tutzing: Schneider. 
 Hermann, Matthias. 2017. Dresdner Kreuzchor und zeitgenössische Chormusik. Ur- und Erstaufführungen zwischen Richter und Kreile. Marburg: Schriften des Dresdner Kreuzchores, vol. 2. pp. 84–85, 290–292, 311–316.

External links 
 Heinz Werner Zimmermann über seine Werke und die Beeinflussung durch den Jazz (in German) Verband Deutscher Konzertchöre April 2010
 

1930 births
2022 deaths
20th-century classical composers
20th-century German composers
20th-century German male musicians
21st-century classical composers
21st-century German composers
21st-century German male musicians
German classical composers
German male classical composers
Hochschule für Musik Freiburg alumni
Musicians from Freiburg im Breisgau
Recipients of the Cross of the Order of Merit of the Federal Republic of Germany